Zika is a breed of domestic rabbit developed in Germany as a high-yielding hybrid for the meat industry.

References

Rabbit breeds